ECPAT International is a global network of civil society organisations that works to end the sexual exploitation of children. It focuses on ending the online sexual exploitation of children, the trafficking of children for sexual purposes, the sexual exploitation of children in prostitution, child, early and forced marriages, and the sexual exploitation of children in the travel and tourism industry.

The ECPAT International network consists of 122 member organisations in 104 countries. Its secretariat is based in Bangkok, Thailand, providing technical support to member groups, coordinating research, and managing international advocacy campaigns.

History
In 1990, researchers and activists helped to establish ECPAT (an acronym for End Child Prostitution in Asian Tourism) as a three-year campaign to end "sex tourism," with an initial focus on Asia. As the terms "child prostitution" and "sex tourism" are no longer used in the sector, today the organization goes by its initials ECPAT. Anti-Slavery International was one of the original supporters, and helped to set up a branch in the UK.

In 1996, in partnership with UNICEF and the NGO Group for the Rights of the Child (now known as Child Rights Connect), ECPAT International co-organised a global world congress against the sexual exploitation of children in Stockholm, Sweden. The congress was hosted by the Government of Sweden, which also played a major role in attracting support and participation from other governments. As a result, ECPAT grew from a regional campaign into a global non-governmental organization.

Between 2009 and 2012, ECPAT, in partnership with The Body Shop, helped run the Stop Sex Trafficking of Children and Young People campaign, which called on governments to safeguard the rights of children and adolescents to protect them from trafficking for sexual purposes. More than 7 million petition signatures were collected worldwide and presented to government officials around the world and to the UN Human Rights Council in Geneva.

Research and human rights reporting 

ECPAT International produces a variety of research and resources for use by its network members, other NGOs, UN agencies, and researchers. These include regular country reports, regional reports and studies on specific forms of child sexual exploitation, such as the sexual exploitation of children in travel and tourism, and the online sexual exploitation of children.

ECPAT is mandated to monitor the commitments of governments around the world and their legal obligations to protect children from sexual exploitation. ECPAT produces regular country monitoring reports that are presented to the United Nations in Geneva, to follow up implementation of the Stockholm Agenda for Action (Stockholm, 1996).

Network membership
The ECPAT network currently consists of 104 member organisations in 93 countries. These include independent civil society organisations, grassroots NGOs and coalitions of NGOs focused on a range of child rights violations.

The Code of Conduct for the Protection of Children from Sexual Exploitation in Travel and Tourism 
The Code is a set of protocols that tourism operators may sign up to, in order to ensure that their businesses do not facilitate or encourage the sexual exploitation of children by travelers and tourists. The Code was developed by ECPAT Sweden in 1996 and is promoted through the international ECPAT network. Today, more than 350 tour operators, hotels, airlines and other travel businesses across 42 countries have become members, including some of the biggest tourism companies in the world.

Protecting children online
ECPAT International works with law enforcement partners, such as INTERPOL, to prevent the online sexual exploitation of children. It engages with other child rights organisations, for example, through the Internet Governance Forum, and is a member of the Virtual Global Taskforce and the European Financial Coalition against Commercial Sexual Exploitation of Children Online. ECPAT is also part of the International Telecommunication Union´s Child Online Protection initiative. ECPAT has signed agreements with the International Association of Internet Hotlines, the Internet Watch Foundation and Child Helpline International.

ECPAT advocates for the ratification of international and regional legal instruments such as the Optional Protocol on the Sale of Children, Child Prostitution and Child Pornography, and the Council of Europe Convention on the Protection of Children against Sexual Exploitation and Sexual Abuse (Lanzarote convention).

Criticism

SESTA/FOSTA and use of false data 
ECPAT-USA has been criticised for its lobbying for Stop Enabling Sex Traffickers Act, which has been described by Vox as a law intended to "curb online sex work" while allegedly making consensual sex work less safe. ECPAT-USA has claimed that at least 100,000 children in the U.S. are commercially sexually exploited, based on reports which used data from 1990 and which have been criticised by social scientists as inaccurate. The Washington Post claimed that the figure was "conjured out of thin air, based on old data from a largely discredited report." ECPAT-USA attempted to justify their use of the figure by citing a NISMART report that claimed that there are 1.7 million child runaway incidents each year, and that their figure was conservative, despite the report stating that only 1,700 of the 1.7 million children were engaged in the sex trade, and that more than three-quarters of children were away from home for less than a week, leaving only a very small window for sex trafficking. ECPAT-USA subsequently agreed "to stop using the figure".

ECPAT-USA has responded to criticism against SESTA, describing legal sex workers as a "very small segment of society that enters sex work with their eyes wide open, and in the absence of coercion". However, since the law came into effect, sex workers have suffered increasing threats of violence, harassment and pimping. Online communities which provide support to sex workers, such as finding shelter or food, issuing warnings about potentially violent clients and providing know-your-rights training, were shut down, putting sex workers in danger. In the past, authorities have used such platforms to track traffickers, and fear that closing them has driven traffickers underground.

Awards
 The 1998 Thorolf Rafto Memorial Prize for Human Rights
 The 2012 Asia Democracy and Human Rights Award
 The 2012 Gold Standard Award for NGO engagement for the Stop Sex Trafficking of Children campaign
 The 2013 Conrad N. Hilton Humanitarian Prize
 The 2017 INTERPOL Crimes Against Children Award

References

External links
 
 Beyond Borders, representative NGO of ECPAT

Organizations established in 1990
Children's rights organizations
International non-profit organizations
Human rights organizations based in Thailand
Organizations that combat human trafficking
Child-related organizations in Thailand
1990 establishments in Thailand
Anti–child pornography organizations
Organizations based in Bangkok